The Hoosier Valley Railroad Museum is a railroad museum located at 507 Mulberry Street in North Judson, Indiana. At one time, a significant portion of the working population in North Judson was employed by one of the railroad companies in town. The town once hosted four major rail lines including the Chesapeake & Ohio, Erie, New York Central and Pennsylvania. North Judson had as many as 125 trains each day.

The first railroad in town was the Chicago and Cincinnati Railroad Company constructed from Logansport to Valparaiso, Indiana, from 1858 through 1861. In 1865 it merged with the Chicago & Great Eastern Railway Company. Later, the line was purchased by the Pennsylvania Railroad. The town had been called Brantwood, then changed to North Judson. The second railroad in town was the Indiana, Illinois and Iowa Railroad, the 3I route. It ran from Streator, Illinois, to North Judson.  Begun in 1881 it reached South Bend, Indiana, in 1894.  Later it was known as the New York Central Railroad. The third line through town was the Chicago and Atlantic Railroad, built in 1881 through 1883. It was absorbed by the Erie Railroad. In 1902 the Cincinnati, Richmond and Muncie Chesapeake & Ohio Railroad was built.  It later merged with the Chesapeake & Ohio Railroad.

The non-profit museum is located at a former Erie Railroad facility.  The museum is open Saturdays all year with train rides also available from May to October.  The collection has a variety of historic freight rolling stock, including Chesapeake and Ohio Railway #2789, a 2-8-4 steam locomotive.

References

External links
 Hoosier Valley Railroad Museum
 Grasselli Tower Project

Railroad museums in Indiana
Museums in Starke County, Indiana